Lumia imaging apps are imaging applications by Microsoft Mobile and formerly by Nokia for Lumia devices built on the technology of Scalado (except for Lumia Panorama which was developed earlier by Nokia originally for Symbian and MeeGo devices). The Lumia imaging applications were notably all branded with "Nokia" in front of their names, but after Microsoft acquired Nokia's devices and services business the Nokia branding was superseded with "Lumia", and often updates included nothing but name changes,  but for the Lumia Camera this included a new wide range of feature additions. Most of the imaging applications are developed by the Microsoft Lund division. As part of the release of Windows 10 Mobile and the integration of Lumia imaging features into the Windows Camera and Microsoft Photos applications some of these applications stopped working in October 2015.

Lumia Camera 

Lumia Camera (previously Nokia Camera) originally created as a merger of the Nokia Pro Cam and Nokia Smart Cam as the new Nokia Camera application that was introduced with the Lumia Black update. The Nokia Camera as introduced in 2013 offers 3 basic modes Camera Mode, Smart Mode and Video Mode, in Smart Mode users can take multiple shots at once in what's called a burst and allows for the removal of objects within the frames, change faces and create "sequence shots". The Camera Mode features a Night and a Sports mode, and Video Mode offers video recording. Due to the high end specs of the Nokia Lumia 1020 and the Nokia Lumia 1520 they received Raw DNG support.

With Lumia Cyan Nokia improved the low-light performances of the Nokia Camera, added continuous autofocus, added support for living images, and has improved the performance of the application. With Lumia Denim Microsoft rebranded the application to the Lumia Camera and launched version 5.0 which included a lot of new features, but was limited to high end Lumia devices with PureView technology only, alongside the launch of the Lumia Camera the Lumia Beta Apps' Nokia Camera Beta app was rebranded as the Lumia Camera Classic for the Nokia Lumia 830, Nokia Lumia 930, Nokia Lumia ICON, and Nokia Lumia 1520.

The Lumia Camera 5.0 included new feature additions such as faster shooting capabilities, 4K-quality video recording which captures 24 frames per second and each individual frame consists of an 8.3 megapixel shot and Rich Capture that adds Auto HDR and Dynamic Flash. Due to the nature of these features they haven't been made available for cheaper and older Lumia devices and are exclusive to newer handsets.

In August 2015 it was reported that the Lumia Camera was no longer an exclusive application to Nokia and Microsoft Lumia devices and could be downloaded on other Windows Phone devices, but would lack several features such as High Dynamic Range (HDR), Dynamic Exposure, and Dynamic Flash which were more bound to Lumia hardware than software.

The ownership of the Lumia Camera UI has been transferred to HMD Global, and it was introduced as part of Nokia Pro Camera in February 2018.

Lumia Cinemagraph 

Lumia Cinemagraph (earlier Nokia Cinemagraph) is an application and Windows Phone camera lens formerly by Nokia and now by Microsoft, which is bundled with its Lumia Windows Phone smartphones. Nokia Cinemagraph was originally based on technology from the Nokia acquisition of Scalado. The software enables the creation of subtle animated GIFs (or cinemagraphs) from images, which can contain stationary and moving components in the same picture. Despite saving files as GIFs, they're exported as regular JPG files and shared Lumia cinemagraphs can not be viewed on other devices.

It was renamed to Lumia cinemagraph after the acquisition of Nokia's Devices and Services units by Microsoft in 2014.

The Lumia Beta Apps division launched the Lumia Cinemagraph Beta which migrated content from Nokia's website to Microsoft OneDrive and subsequently implemented this feature in Lumia Cinemagraph. Previously cinemagraphs used to be synchronized via the Nokia Memories site.

Lumia Creative Studio 

Lumia Creative Studio (previously Nokia Creative Studio) is an imaging editing application that lets users edit photographs and merge them into panoramas, apply after effects with photo filters such as sketching, night vision, dreamy, cartoon, colour and silkscreen. The Nokia Creative Studio was later updated to let users edit and create new photographs directly using the built-in camera, and added cropping, adjusting, and Instagram-like effects, additional features include face warps and live styles these filters let users edit the viewfinder in near real-time. Images created using the Lumia Creative Studio can be shared on various social networks like Twitter, Flickr, and the Facebook. Nokia Creative Studio 6 introduced non-destructive editing which allows users to work and rework images an unlimited number of times, more features added in version 6 include rotation, straightening, and changing the aspect ratio.

Lumia Panorama 

Lumia Panorama (previously Nokia Panorama) was a Lumia app that originated on Symbian and MeeGo, it allows users to make panoramas in both portrait and landscape mode and allows users to directly share them on the Facebook and Twitter. In September 2015 Microsoft announced that they would no longer release updates or support for Lumia Panorama.

Lumia Play To 

Lumia Play To (previously Nokia Play To and Play To) is a DLNA-based application, it allows users to share media across devices. It was originally debuted on Symbian handsets and was introduced in the Nokia Beta Labs in 2012 for Lumia handsets.

Lumia Refocus 

Lumia Refocus (previously Nokia Refocus) was revealed at the Nokia World event in Abu Dhabi in 2013 exclusive to Lumia devices with Nokia PureView capabilities, it featured the ability to alter the focus of pictures after you've already taken them, when launched it started up in camera mode and is able to do analyses between the scenes and takes between two and eight photos that allows the user to refocus it afterwards, furthermore it has social network sharing built in. In September 2015 Microsoft announced that they would discontinue the online service related to Lumia Refocus on October 30, 2015 and will remove the application from the Windows Phone Store.

Lumia Selfie 

Lumia Selfie (previously Nokia Glam Me) is a "selfie"-based application that can use both the front and the main camera, it offers facial recognition (but has trouble recognising faces wearing eyeglasses) and can edit "selfies" by giving the user a bigger smile, whiter teeth, enlarge their eyes, change colour, and make the picture brighter or less bright. In August 2015 Microsoft added support for selfie sticks.

Lumia Share 

Lumia Share (previously Nokia Share) is a photo synchronisation application for Windows and Windows Phone designed to connect Nokia Lumia smartphone to the Nokia Lumia 2520, it shares photos through the Lumia Storyteller app and needs to connect over WiFi, it works exclusively with the Nokia Lumia 2520 and doesn't work with any other Microsoft Windows device.

Lumia Storyteller 

Lumia Storyteller (previously Nokia Storyteller) was a scrapbooking app Windows and Windows Phone that displays photos and videos taken on a Lumia device in the manner of a story, it integrates with Here maps to show where every individual photograph and video clip has been taken, and if its recorded on the Nokia Lumia 1520 it allows audiophiles that can capture directional stereo samples. In September 2015 Microsoft announced that they would discontinue Lumia Storyteller and its associated online service on October 30, 2015 as some of its features would be implemented in the Windows 10 Photos app.

Lumia Video Trimmer 

Lumia Video Trimmer (previously Nokia Video Trimmer) is a video editing application originally launched by Nokia, it allows users to edit and share videos recorded on their Lumia devices.

Movie Creator Beta 

Movie Creator Beta (previously Nokia Video Director though the Nokia Video Director application is still published in the Windows Phone Store as a separate client) is a video creation application launched by Microsoft Mobile in 2014 for Windows and Windows Phone, it allows users to merge photographs, video clips, music samples and text into movies. It features unlimited video length (though it's limited by a total of 25 content slots), pan-and-zoom, and offers various filters and themes, some of the themes and filters include DreamWorks' Kung-Fu Panda and Madagascar movies. It offers compatibility with content created on other devices, though it should first be moved to the device on which Movie Creator is installed before these can be edited.

In April 2015 Movie Creator Beta got Microsoft OneDrive and 4K video support.

Microsoft Photos Add-ins 

Microsoft Photos Add-ins (previously called Lumia Moments) is a Lumia Denim enabled feature that can take frames from videos and turn them into individual pictures, due to the processing power it requires, only the Nokia Lumia ICON, Nokia Lumia 1520, Nokia Lumia 830, and Nokia Lumia 930 devices can run the software as the Lumia Imaging SDK integrates with newer Qualcomm Snapdragon processors. Lumia Moments has 2 types of images that it can create, one is the Best Frame which saves a photo as a "living image" and can be viewed in motion from Windows Phone's camera roll or Lumia Storyteller, and the other is Action Shots that lets users add strobe effects and blur the pictures.

With Windows 10 Mobile Microsoft decided to quietly rebranded the Lumia Moments application, the removal of the Lumia branding happened at the same time as the discontinuation of several Lumia imaging applications.

PhotoBeamer 

PhotoBeamer (previously Nokia PhotoBeamer) was an imaging application originally created by Scalado and ported to Windows Phone after the Nokia acquisition, it lets users an image from their Lumia device on any display as long as it's connected to the internet, when beamed the application will ask the user to go to the PhotoBeamer application on the other internet-capable device (including other mobile telephones, tablets, notebooks, and smart televisions). the PhotoBeamer site will show a QR Code that asks the user to scan it with Bing Vision and download the application from the Windows Phone Store. In September 2015 Microsoft announced that they would discontinue the PhotoBeamer application and its associated web page as they would integrate some of its features in Windows 10.

Smart Shoot 

Smart Shoot (previously Nokia Smart Shoot) is a camera application which lets users capture selected parts of a photo by using a lens for the camera app that takes a number of photos in quick succession then it allows users to select "the best" moments from each individual image, Smart Shoot can select faces from various succeeding images so if one person blinks during a single shot and doesn't blink during the next and let the user choose the faces they prefer for the picture. Smart Shoot can be launched through the application picker or via the Microsoft Camera's lenses, when attempting to take a shot the app will enquire the user to hold the phone steady, if the picture is correctly taken users may remove objects and people from the photograph.

Video Upload 
Video Uploader (previously Nokia Video Upload) was a YouTube-based video uploader that let Lumia users upload their videos to Google's YouTube, initially it was only launched for the Nokia Lumia 1020 but got expanded to additional devices. In September 2015 Microsoft announced that they would no longer update nor support the Video Upload application, but that people who had previously downloaded the application could still use it as they always had but that it would immediately be removed from the Windows Phone Store.

Video Tuner 

Video Tuner (previously Nokia Video Tuner) is a video editing application that enables trimming, slowing down footage, brightening the video's colours, adding music to frames, applying filters, rotating, cropping and sharing directly shared to Instagram. The software integrates with the Lumia Imaging SDK that enables developers to create similar editing software in their own applications.

See also 
 Microsoft Lumia
 Lumia Beta Apps
 PureView
 Google Camera
 Microsoft mobile services

References

External links
 Cinemagraph on your Nokia Lumia 920 & Lumia 820
 Lumia Refocus
 Microsoft's PhotoBeamer
 Lumia Storyteller

Windows Phone software
Nokia services